The Nebraska College Conference (NCC), known as the Nebraska Intercollegiate Conference from 1916 to 1926 and later as the Nebraska College Athletic Conference (NCAC), was an intercollegiate athletic conference that existed from 1916 to 1976. The league had members, as its name suggests, in the state of Nebraska. The public colleges in the conference departed for the separate Nebraska Intercollegiate Athletic Association (NIAA) in 1928 but re-joined after 1942.

In November 1959, the Nebraska College Conference accepted the withdrawal of Concordia College (now known as Concordia University Nebraska), Dana College, and Midland College (now known as Midland University). Those three schools joined the Tri-State Conference at its formation in 1960. Nebraska Wesleyan University left in 1969 to join the newly formed Nebraska Intercollegiate Athletic Conference (NIAC) (now called the Great Plains Athletic Conference (GPAC)).

Football champions

 1916 – 
 1917 – Unknown
 1918 – Unknown
 1919 – 
 1920 – No champion
 1921 – 
 1922 – 
 1923 – Unknown
 1924 – 
 1925 – 
 1926 – 
 1927 – 
 1928 – 
 1929 – 
 1930 – 
 1931 – 
 1932 –  and 
 1933 – 
 1934 – 
 1935 – 
 1936 – 

 1937 – 
 1938 –  and 
 1939 – Vacant
 1940 –  and 
 1941 – 
 1942 – 
 1943 – No champion
 1944 – No champion
 1945 – 
 1946 – Doane 
 1947 –  and 
 1948 –  and 
 1949 – 
 1950 –  
 1951 –  and 
 1952 – 
 1953 – 
 1954 – 
 1955 – 
 1956 – 

 1957 – 
 1958 –  and 
 1959 – 
 1960 – 
 1961 – 
 1962 – 
 1963 – 
 1964 – 
 1966 – 
 1967 – 
 1968 – 
 1969 – 
 1970 – 
 1971 – 
 1972 – 
 1973 – 
 1974 – 
 1975 – 
 1976 –

See also
 List of defunct college football conferences

References

 
College sports in Nebraska